Bond v. United States, 564 U.S. 211 (2011), is a decision by the Supreme Court of the United States that individuals, just like states, may have standing to raise Tenth Amendment challenges to a federal law.

The issue arose in the prosecution of an individual under the federal Chemical Weapons Convention Implementation Act for a local assault that used a chemical irritant. The defendant argued, in part, that the application of the law violated the Constitution's federalism limitations on the statutory implementation of treaties by Congress.

Having decided the defendant could bring the constitutional challenge, the Court remanded the case without deciding the merits of the claims.

Background
After the husband of Carol A. Bond of Lansdale, Pennsylvania, impregnated Myrlinda Haynes, Bond told Haynes, "I am going to make your life a living hell." Carol Bond stole the poisonous chemical: 10-chlorophenox arsine from her employer (Rohm and Haas) and  purchased potassium dichromate from the internet. Bond smeared the chemicals on doorknobs, car doors, and the mailbox. Haynes suffered a chemical burn on her thumb. Bond was indicted for stealing mail and for violation of the Chemical Weapons Convention Implementation Act of 1998.

Her appeal argued that applying the chemical weapons treaty to her violated the Tenth Amendment. The Court of Appeals found Bond lacked standing to make a Tenth Amendment claim.

Decision
The Supreme Court concluded unanimously that Bond had standing to argue that a federal statute enforcing the Chemical Weapons Convention in that instance intruded on areas of police power reserved to the states. Justice Kennedy reasoned that actions exceeding the federal government's enumerated powers undermine the sovereign interests of the states. Individuals seeking to challenge such actions are subject to Article III and prudential standing rules, but if the litigant is a party to an otherwise-justiciable case or controversy, the litigant is not forbidden to object that the injury results from disregard of the federal structure of American government.

The Court expressed no view on the merits of Bond's challenge to the federal statute and remanded the case to the Third Circuit Court of Appeals.

Subsequent history

The Third Circuit, on remand, found that the Supreme Court's decision gave Bond standing to raise federalism questions about the federal government's power to enforce legislation that implements a treaty. However, the circuit court found the 1920 Supreme Court precedent Missouri v. Holland made the legislation indisputably valid since the treaty is valid.

The case then returned to the Supreme Court in Bond v. United States, 572 U.S. 844 (2014) in which it ruled that since the Implementation Act did not reach her conduct, the Court declined to address the constitutional issue.

See also
 Reid v. Covert, a 1957 decision in which the U.S. Supreme Court ruled that an executive agreement cannot override the Constitutional right to trial by jury.

References

External links
 
Question Presented

https://web.archive.org/web/20140801104500/http://www.justice.gov/usao/pae/News/Pr/2007/sep/bondrelease.pdf

United States Constitution Article Three case law
United States Supreme Court cases
United States Supreme Court cases of the Roberts Court
2011 in United States case law
United States Tenth Amendment case law
United States standing case law